Stephen Mark Shore (born September 27, 1961) is an American autistic professor of special education at Adelphi University.  He has written several books on autism: College for Students with Disabilities, Understanding Autism for Dummies, Ask and Tell, and Beyond the Wall.  Currently, he serves on the board of Autism Speaks, and is one of the first two autistic board members in its history, looking to improve the potential of those on the autism spectrum.  He once headed the Asperger's Association of New England and was on the board of the Autism Society of America.

Shore lost language skills at age 2 and a half, then started getting them back at four years old.  He has been described as having a special interest in music.  He has discussed difficulties with completing assignments presented in formats that he wasn't used to, leading him to transfer from a doctorate in music education to an ED.D. in Special Education with a focus on matching researched practice to individual profiles.

His book, Ask and Tell, describes ways that autistic people can advocate for their needs. His most popular two books, Beyond The Wall, and Ask and Tell were translated into Russian, Polish, Japanese, Chinese, Korean, Arabic, Bengali and Vietnamese languages.

References

External links

American activists
American educational theorists
Autism activists
Living people
People on the autism spectrum
1961 births
Academics with disabilities